Group G of UEFA Euro 2020 qualifying was one of the ten groups to decide which teams would qualify for the UEFA Euro 2020 finals tournament. Group G consisted of six teams: Austria, Israel, Latvia, North Macedonia, Poland and Slovenia, where they played against each other home-and-away in a round-robin format.

The top two teams, Poland and Austria, qualified directly for the finals. Unlike previous editions, the participants of the play-offs were not be decided based on results from the qualifying group stage, but instead based on their performance in the 2018–19 UEFA Nations League.

Standings

Matches
The fixtures were released by UEFA the same day as the draw, which was held on 2 December 2018 in Dublin. Times are CET/CEST, as listed by UEFA (local times, if different, are in parentheses).

Goalscorers

Discipline
A player was automatically suspended for the next match for the following offences:
 Receiving a red card (red card suspensions could be extended for serious offences)
 Receiving three yellow cards in three different matches, as well as after fifth and any subsequent yellow card (yellow card suspensions were not carried forward to the play-offs, the finals or any other future international matches)

The following suspensions were served during the qualifying matches:

Notes

References

External links
UEFA Euro 2020, UEFA.com
European Qualifiers, UEFA.com

Group G
2018–19 in Austrian football
2019–20 in Austrian football
Austria at UEFA Euro 2020
2018–19 in Israeli football
2019–20 in Israeli football
2019 in Latvian football
2018–19 in North Macedonia football
2019–20 in North Macedonia football
North Macedonia at UEFA Euro 2020
2018–19 in Polish football
2019–20 in Polish football
Poland at UEFA Euro 2020
2018–19 in Slovenian football
2019–20 in Slovenian football